Worley may refer to:

Places
 Worley, Idaho, United States
 Worley, Kentucky, United States
 Worley, West Virginia, United States
 Worley Point, Antarctica

People
 Worley (surname), people with the surname Worley
 Worley baronets
 Worley Edwards (1850-1927), New Zealand lawyer and judge
 Worley Thorne, American screenwriter

Other
 Worley (company), a company formerly called WorleyParsons
 Worley noise, used in computer graphics for texture generation